The New Hampshire Air National Guard (NH ANG) is the aerial militia of the U.S. state of New Hampshire. It is, along with the New Hampshire Army National Guard, an element of the New Hampshire National Guard.

As state militia units, the units in the New Hampshire Air National Guard are not in the normal United States Air Force chain of command. They are under the jurisdiction of the Governor of New Hampshire through the office of the state adjutant general unless they are federalized by order of the President of the United States. The New Hampshire Air National Guard is headquartered in Newington, with a postal address of Portsmouth.

Overview
Under the "Total Force" concept, New Hampshire Air National Guard units are considered to be Air Reserve Components (ARC) of the United States Air Force (USAF). New Hampshire ANG units are trained and equipped by the Air Force and are operationally gained by a Major Command of the USAF if federalized. In addition, the New Hampshire Air National Guard forces are assigned to Air Expeditionary Forces and are subject to deployment tasking orders along with their active duty and Air Force Reserve counterparts in their assigned cycle deployment window.

Along with their federal reserve obligations, as state militia units the elements of the New Hampshire ANG are subject to being activated by order of the Governor to provide protection of life and property, and preserve peace, order and public safety. State missions include disaster relief in times of earthquakes, hurricanes, floods and forest fires, search and rescue, protection of vital public services, and support to civil defense.

Components 
The New Hampshire Air National Guard consists of the following major unit:
 157th Air Refueling Wing
 Established 4 April 1947 (as: 133d Fighter Squadron); operates: KC-46A Pegasus
 Stationed at: Pease Air National Guard Base, Portsmouth 
 Gained by: Air Mobility Command
 The 157th ARW provides worldwide air refueling support to major commands of the United States Air Force, as well as other U.S. military forces and the military forces of allied nations flying the KC-46A Pegasus.

 The 64th Air Refueling Squadron is a part of the 22nd Operations Group, McConnell Air Force Base, but is operationally assigned to the 157th Air Refueling Wing. The partnership was formed as part of the Active Associate concept where Active Duty Airmen are assigned to an Air National Guard unit.

History
On 24 May 1946, the United States Army Air Forces, in response to dramatic postwar military budget cuts imposed by President Harry S. Truman, allocated inactive unit designations to the National Guard Bureau for the formation of an Air Force National Guard. These unit designations were allotted and transferred to various State National Guard bureaus to provide them unit designations to re-establish them as Air National Guard units.

The New Hampshire Air National Guard origins date to the formation of the 133d Fighter Squadron at Grenier Field, Manchester, receiving federal recognition on 4 April 1947. It was equipped with F-47D Thunderbolts and its mission was the air defense of the state. 18 September 1947, however, is considered the New Hampshire Air National Guard's official birth, concurrent with the establishment of the United States Air Force as a separate branch of the United States military under the National Security Act.

On 25 June 1950, the New Hampshire Air National Guard was federalized and placed on active duty. The 133d was federalized on 10 February 1951 and assigned to the federalized Maine ANG 101st Fighter-Interceptor Wing, although it initially remained stationed at Grenier AFB, mostly flying gunnery practice missions. Its mission was expanded to include the air defense of New England, although a majority of officers and a substantial number of airmen saw duty overseas in different theaters of operations including Korean combat missions. The squadron was then attached to the Air Defense Command 23d Fighter-Interceptor Wing at Presque Isle AFB, Maine, on 1 April 1951 with no change of mission. It was reassigned to the 4711th Defense Wing on 6 February 1952 at Presque Isle AFB. It was released from active duty and returned to the control of the State of New Hampshire on 1 November 1952.

In 1960, the mission of the NH Air National Guard changed to air transport in time for their participation in the Berlin Crisis of 1961. This is also when they received their present 157th designation. In the mid-1960s, the 157th moved to Pease Air Force Base, from which they also began flying logistical support to U.S. troops in Vietnam. In 1974, the NH Air National Guard received its current mission as in-flight refuelers.

Within hours of the September 11 attacks in 2001, the NH Air Guard began refueling the fighter jets that patrolled the airspace over major U.S. cities. The 157th was later deployed overseas in support of the War on Terror.

The NH National Guard responded to Operation Iraqi Freedom in what was the largest call up of New Hampshire troops since World War II. Over half of New Hampshire's soldiers and airmen served overseas, conducting various security and infantry missions, providing medical care, building schools, and fostering international relations. The 157th refueled planes further forward in the conflict than at any other time in their history.

After the September 11th, 2001 terrorist attacks on the United States, elements of every Air National Guard unit in New Hampshire were activated in support of the Global War on Terrorism. Flight crews, aircraft maintenance personnel, communications technicians, air controllers and air security personnel were engaged in Operation Noble Eagle air defense overflights of major United States cities. Also, New Hampshire ANG units have been deployed overseas as part of Operation Enduring Freedom in Afghanistan and Operation Iraqi Freedom in Iraq, as well as other locations as directed.

See also
New Hampshire State Guard
New Hampshire Wing Civil Air Patrol

References

 Gross, Charles J. (1996), The Air National Guard and the American Military Tradition, United States Dept. of Defense, 
 New Hampshire National Guard website

External links

 157th Air Refueling Wing
 History of the NH ANG

United States Air National Guard
Military in New Hampshire